Spatulignatha longizonalis is a moth in the family Lecithoceridae. It is found in China (Guangxi).

References

Moths described in 2014
Spatulignatha
Moths of Asia